Bill Algeo (born June 9, 1989) is an American mixed martial artist who competes in the Featherweight division of the Ultimate Fighting Championship.

Background
Bill Algeo, a Delaware county native, started his martial arts career at the age of 14 after following his brother's footsteps in wrestling. Going 0-14 to start his wrestling career, four years later he went on to become All-State and captain of the wrestling team.

Starting Brazilian jiu-jitsu at 18, two years later he was running a BJJ program at Penn State University where he was going to school full time for his B.A. in accounting. While at Penn State, he was also a member of the Penn State boxing team, and was partaking in amateur MMA bouts, going undefeated as an amateur, until turning professional in 2011.

Mixed martial arts career

Early career
Starting his professional mixed martial artist career in June 2012, he submitted David Miller via arm-triangle choke in the first round in his MMA debut. Losing his next bout against Dean Lavin via first round armbar, Algeo would go win his next 5 bouts, tapping out 4 of them and ending the other via TKO. Losing to future UFC fighter Shane Burgos in his next bout at CFFC 42 via unanimous decision, he defeated his next two foes via decision in Anthony Terrell and Jeff Lentz at CFFC 49 and CFFC 57, missing weight in his championship bout against Lentz, meaning he was unable to win the title. In his second try for the CFFC Featherweight title, he lost to Jared Gordon via unanimous decision. Debuting with Ring Of Combat at ROC 61, Algeo defeated Tim Dooling via TKO in the second round, winning the ROC Featherweight title. He would defend his title three times, defeating James Gonzalez via unanimous decision at ROC 63, knocking out Scott Heckman in the second round at ROC 65, and tapping out John de Jesus via rear-naked choke in the second round at ROC 67. After this win, he was invited to Dana White's Contender Series 17, where he lost to Brendan Loughnane via unanimous decision. Algeo would return to CFFC for CFFC 83, where rematched against Tim Dooling, once again winning against him, this time via unanimous decision.

Ultimate Fighting Championship
Algeo made his UFC debut, as a short notice replacement for Ryan Hall, against Ricardo Lamas  on August 29, 2020 at UFC Fight Night: Smith vs. Rakić. He lost the fight via unanimous decision. This fight earned him the Fight of the Night award.

Algeo faced Spike Carlyle at UFC on ESPN: Smith vs. Clark on November 28, 2020. He won the bout via unanimous decision.

Algeo was scheduled to face Ricardo Ramos on April 17, 2021 at UFC on ESPN: Whittaker vs. Gastelum. However, Ramos was pulled from the fight during the week leading up to the event due to COVID-19 protocols. The bout was cancelled, and was rescheduled for UFC Fight Night: Font vs. Garbrandt. Algeo lost a close bout via unanimous decision. Seven MMA media outlets gave it to Ramos and six media outlets gave it to Algeo.

Algeo faced Joanderson Brito on January 15, 2022 at UFC on ESPN 32. He won the fight via unanimous decision.

Algeo was scheduled to face Billy Quarantillo  on July 16, 2022 at UFC on ABC 3. However, after Quarantillo pulled out due to injury, Algeo was booked against Herbert Burns. He won the fight via TKO in the second round after Burns was unable to return to his feet. This win earned Algeo his first Performance of the Night bonus award.

Algeo faced Andre Fili on September 17, 2022 at UFC Fight Night 210, after Fili's original opponent, Lando Vannata, pulled out due to injury.  He lost the fight via split decision.

Algeo is scheduled to face T.J. Brown  on April 15, 2023 at UFC on ESPN 44.

Championships and accomplishments 
 Ultimate Fighting Championship
Fight of the Night (One time)
 Performance of the Night (One time) 
 Ring of Combat
 ROC Featherweight Champion (One time)
3 successful title defenses

Mixed martial arts record

|Loss
|align=center|16–7
|Andre Fili
|Decision (split)
|UFC Fight Night: Sandhagen vs. Song 
|
|align=center|3
|align=center|5:00
|Las Vegas, Nevada, United States
|
|-
|Win
|align=center|16–6
|Herbert Burns
|TKO (retirement)
|UFC on ABC: Ortega vs. Rodríguez
|
|align=center|2
|align=center|1:50
|Elmont, New York, United States
|
|-
|Win
|align=center|15–6
|Joanderson Brito
|Decision (unanimous)
|UFC on ESPN: Kattar vs. Chikadze
|
|align=center|3
|align=center|5:00
|Las Vegas, Nevada, United States
|
|-
|Loss
|align=center|14–6
|Ricardo Ramos
|Decision (unanimous)
|UFC Fight Night: Font vs. Garbrandt
|
|align=center|3
|align=center|5:00
|Las Vegas, Nevada, United States
|
|-
| Win
| align=center| 14–5
| Spike Carlyle
|Decision (unanimous)
| UFC on ESPN: Smith vs. Clark
| 
| align=center|3
| align=center|5:00
| Las Vegas, Nevada, United States
|
|-
| Loss
| align=center| 13–5
| Ricardo Lamas
|Decision (unanimous)
|UFC Fight Night: Smith vs. Rakić
|
|align=center|3
|align=center|5:00
|Las Vegas, Nevada, United States
|
|-
| Win
| align=center| 13–4
| Tim Dooling
| Decision (unanimous)
| CFFC 83
| 
| align=center| 3
| align=center| 5:00
| Philadelphia, Pennsylvania, United States
| 
|-
| Loss
| align=center| 12–4
| Brendan Loughnane
| Decision (unanimous)
| Dana White's Contender Series 17
| 
| align=center| 3
| align=center| 5:00
| Las Vegas, Nevada, United States
|
|-
| Win
| align=center| 12–3
| John De Jesus
| Submission (rear-naked choke)
|Ring of Combat 67
|
|align=center|2
|align=center|3:07
|Las Vegas, Nevada, United States
|
|-
| Win
| align=center| 11–3
| Scott Heckman
|KO (flying head kick)
|Ring of Combat 65
|
|align=center| 2
|align=center| 3:24
|Atlantic City, New Jersey, United States
| 
|-
| Win
| align=center| 10–3
| James Gonzalez
|Decision (unanimous)
|Ring of Combat 63
|
|align=center|3
|align=center|5:00
|Atlantic City, New Jersey, United States
| 
|-
| Win
| align=center| 9–3
| Tim Dooling
| TKO (punches)
| Ring of Combat 61
| 
| align=center| 2
| align=center| 3:28
| Atlantic City, New Jersey, United States
|
|-
| Loss
| align=center| 8–3
| Jared Gordon
| Decision (unanimous)
| CFFC 63
| 
| align=center| 4
| align=center| 5:00
| Atlantic City, New Jersey, United States
|
|-
| Win
| align=center| 8–2
|Jeff Lentz
|Decision (unanimous)
|CFFC 57
|
|align=center|5
|align=center|5:00
|Philadelphia, Pennsylvania, United States
|
|-
| Win
| align=center|7–2
| Anthony Terrell Smith
|Decision (unanimous)
|CFFC 49
|
|align=center|3
|align=center|5:00
|Bethlehem, Pennsylvania, United States
|
|-
| Loss
| align=center|6–2
| Shane Burgos
|Submission (rear-naked choke)
|CFFC 42
|
|align=center|2
|align=center|2:35
|Chester, Pennsylvania, United States
|
|-
| Win
| align=center| 6–1
| Mike Pope
| Submission (rear-naked choke)
| CFFC 37
| 
| align=center| 1
| align=center| 2:51
| Philadelphia, Pennsylvania, United States
| 
|-
| Win
| align=center| 5–1
| Joel Roberts
| TKO (punches)
| CFFC 32
|
|align=Center|3
|align=center|2:08
|King of Prussia, Pennsylvania, United States
| 
|-
| Win
| align=center| 4–1
| Myron Baker
| Submission (rear-naked choke)
|CFFC 27
|
|align=center|2
|align=center|3:26
|King of Prussia, Pennsylvania, United States
|
|-
| Win
| align=center| 3–1
| Frank Buenafuente
| Submission (rear-naked choke)
|WSOF 2
|
|align=center|2
|align=center|4:36
|Atlantic City, New Jersey, United States
| 
|-
| Win
| align=center| 2–1
| Shane Manley
| Submission (rear-naked choke)
| CFFC 20
| 
| align=center| 2
| align=center| 2:28
| King of Prussia, Pennsylvania, United States
| 
|-
| Loss
| align=center| 1–1
| Dean Lavin
| Submission (armbar)
| Cage Wars 18
| 
| align=center| 1
| align=center| 1:11
| Chester, Pennsylvania, United States
|
|-
| Win
| align=center| 1–0
| David Miller
| Submission (arm-triangle choke)
| Cage Wars 15
| 
| align=center| 1
| align=center| 3:40
| Chester, Pennsylvania, United States
|

See also 
 List of current UFC fighters
 List of male mixed martial artists

References

External links 
  
 

Living people
Featherweight mixed martial artists
1989 births
American male mixed martial artists
Mixed martial artists utilizing boxing
Mixed martial artists utilizing wrestling
Mixed martial artists utilizing Brazilian jiu-jitsu
Ultimate Fighting Championship male fighters
American male sport wrestlers
Amateur wrestlers
American practitioners of Brazilian jiu-jitsu
People awarded a black belt in Brazilian jiu-jitsu